Adrian Klepczyński (born 1 April 1981) is a Polish footballer.

Notes
 
 

Polish footballers
Raków Częstochowa players
RKS Radomsko players
Stal Głowno players
Widzew Łódź players
Polonia Bytom players
Piast Gliwice players
GKS Bełchatów players
1981 births
Living people
Sportspeople from Częstochowa
Association football defenders